This article lists the diplomatic missions in Ivory Coast (Côte d'Ivoire). At present, Abidjan, the largest city in the country, currently hosts 51 embassies. Meanwhile, the capital Yamoussoukro hosts no embassies.

Embassies in Abidjan

Other posts in Abidjan 
 European Union (Delegation)
 Taiwan

Consulates in Bouake

Consulates in Soubré

Non-resident embassies 

 (Abuja)
 (Accra)
 (Dakar)
 (Dakar)
 (Rabat)
 (Conakry)
 (Accra)
 (Dakar)
 (Dakar)
 (Abuja)
 (Accra)
 (London)
 (Conakry)
 (Rabat)
 (Dakar)
 (Abuja)
 (Pretoria)
 (Abuja)
 (Dakar)
 (Accra) 
 (New York City)
 (Monrovia)
 (Abuja)
 (Dakar)
 (Stockholm)
 (Abuja)
 (Accra)
 (Abuja)
 (Abuja)
 (Dakar)
 (Rabat)
 (Accra)

Closed missions

See also 
 Foreign relations of Ivory Coast
 List of diplomatic missions of Ivory Coast

References

External links 
 Embassies/Consulates in Ivory Coast

Ivory Coast
Missions